Poland competed at the 2017 World Championships in Athletics in London, United Kingdom, from 4–13 August 2017.

Medalists

* Indicates the athlete only competed in the preliminary heats and received medals.

Results
(q – qualified, NM – no mark, SB – season best, PB – personal best)

Men
Track and road events

Field events

Women 
Track and road events

* – Indicates the athlete competed in preliminaries but not the final

Field events

References 

Nations at the 2017 World Championships in Athletics
World Championships in Athletics
Poland at the World Championships in Athletics